Grumiaux is a surname of French origin. People with that name include:

Arthur Grumiaux (192186), Belgian violinist who was also a proficient pianist
Émile Grumiaux (18611932), French competitor in the sport of archery

See also
4571 Grumiaux (1985 RY3), a Main-belt Asteroid discovered in 1985
 

Surnames of French origin